William Ramsay Young (13 July 1894 – 9 January 1965) was an Australian soldier. Young was born in Coatbridge, Lanarkshire (Lanark), Scotland and died in Daw Park, Adelaide, South Australia.

See also

References

Australian Army soldiers
Australian people of Scottish descent
1894 births
1965 deaths
People from Coatbridge
British emigrants to Australia